Sinion Glacier is the 6 km long and 3 km wide glacier on Nordenskjöld Coast in Graham Land situated southwest of Zaychar Glacier and north of Akaga Glacier.  It drains the southeast slopes of Detroit Plateau, and flows east-southeastwards along the south slopes of Kableshkov Ridge to enter Odrin Bay in Weddell Sea.  The feature is named after the Bulgar ruler Sinion (6th century).

Location
British mapping in 1978.

Maps
 British Antarctic Territory.  Scale 1:200000 topographic map.  DOS 610 Series, Sheet W 64 60.  Directorate of Overseas Surveys, Tolworth, UK, 1978.
 Antarctic Digital Database (ADD). Scale 1:250000 topographic map of Antarctica. Scientific Committee on Antarctic Research (SCAR). Since 1993, regularly upgraded and updated.

References
 Sinion Glacier. SCAR Composite Antarctic Gazetteer.
 Bulgarian Antarctic Gazetteer. Antarctic Place-names Commission. (details in Bulgarian, basic data in English)

External links
 Sinion Glacier. Copernix satellite image

Bulgaria and the Antarctic
Glaciers of Nordenskjöld Coast